Neoplecostomus is a genus of fish in the family Loricariidae native to South America.  Neoplecostomus can be distinguished from all other loricariids by a modified shield of small plates on the abdomen with posteriorly directed odontodes; the shield appears to act as a holdfast. The color pattern is generally mottled brown with the abdomen white. The head is long, rounded, and shovel-shaped. The fin spines are weak. They range from about  SL. The species of Neoplecostomus live in fast-flowing water.

Species
There are currently 18 recognized species in this genus:
 Neoplecostomus bandeirante Roxo, C. de Oliveira & Zawadzki, 2012
 Neoplecostomus botucatu Roxo, C. de Oliveira & Zawadzki, 2012
 Neoplecostomus corumba Zawadzki, Pavanelli & Langeani, 2008
 Neoplecostomus doceensis Roxo, G. S. C. Silva, Zawadzki & C. de Oliveira, 2014
 Neoplecostomus espiritosantensis Langeani, 1990
 Neoplecostomus franciscoensis Langeani, 1990
 Neoplecostomus granosus (Valenciennes, 1840)
 Neoplecostomus jaguari B. N. Andrade & Langeani, 2014
 Neoplecostomus langeanii Roxo, C. de Oliveira & Zawadzki, 2012
 Neoplecostomus microps (Steindachner, 1877)
 Neoplecostomus paranensis Langeani, 1990
 Neoplecostomus paraty Cherobim, Lazzarotto & Langeani, 2017
 Neoplecostomus pirangaensis Oliveira & Oyakawa, 2019
 Neoplecostomus ribeirensis Langeani, 1990
 Neoplecostomus selenae Zawadzki, Pavanelli & Langeani, 2008
 Neoplecostomus variipictus Bizerril, 1995
 Neoplecostomus watersi Silva, Reia, Zawadzki & Roxo, 2019
 Neoplecostomus yapo Zawadzki, Pavanelli & Langeani, 2008

References

 
Catfish genera
Freshwater fish genera
Taxa named by Carl H. Eigenmann
Taxa named by Rosa Smith Eigenmann